Nationality words link to articles with information on the nation's poetry or literature (for instance, Irish or France).

Events
 Nicholas Rowe's widow receives a pension from King George I of Great Britain in recognition of her husband's translation of Lucan's Pharsalia, published complete posthumously this year (dated 1718) with a life of Rowe by James Welwood.

Works published

United Kingdom

 Joseph Addison:
 The Old Whig. Numb. I, published anonymously on March 19
 The Old Whig. Numb. II, published anonymously on April 2
 John Durant Breval:
 Mac-Dermot; or, The Irish Fortune-Hunter
 Ovid in Masquerade, published under the pen name "Mr. Joseph Gay" (although the pseudonym was also used by Francis Chute)
 Thomas D'Urfey, Songs Compleat, Pleasant and Divertive, in five volumes, the first two consisting of verse written by D'Urfey, a revised edition of Wit and Mirth, or Pills to Purge Melancholy, which had been published since 1598; after the book sold out this year, it went into a second edition under the original title (a sixth volume was added in 1720); although the pieces were meant to be sung, only the words were provided
 Giles Jacob, The Poetical Register; or, The Lives and Characters of the English Dramatick Poets, With an Account of their Writings, biography and criticism (a second volume, titled An Historical Account of the Lives and Writings of Our most Considerable English Poets, whether Epick, Lyrick, Elegaick, Eppigrammatists, Etc. was published in 1720; both volumes reissued in 1723
 Matthew Prior, Poems on Several Occasions, the book states "1718", but it was not ready for subscribers until March of this year (see also Poems on Several Occasions 1709)
 Allan Ramsay:
 Content
 Scots Songs (see also Scots Songs 1718)
 Nicholas Rowe, Lucan's Pharsalia, Translated into English Verse, dated "1718"
 George Sewell, Poems on Several Occasions
 Isaac Watts, Psalms of David
 Edward Young, A Letter to Mr. Tickell, on the death of Joseph Addison

Other
 Jean-Baptiste, abbé Du Bos, Réflexions critiques sur la poésie et la pienture, identifying the appeal of art, whether poetry or painting, as emotional rather than primarily intellectual enjoyment; criticism, France
 Ludvig Holberg, Pedar Paars, comic Danish heroic poem

Births
Death years link to the corresponding "[year] in poetry" article:
 January 28 – Johann Elias Schlegel (died 1749), German critic and poet
 January 30 – Magnus Gottfried Lichtwer (died 1783), German poet
 April 2 – Johann Wilhelm Ludwig Gleim (died 1803), German poet
 September 27 – Abraham Gotthelf Kästner (died 1800), German poet
 November 4 – James Cawthorn (died 1761 in poetry), English poet and schoolmaster
 Probable date – James Eyre Weeks, English poet

Deaths
Birth years link to the corresponding "[year] in poetry" article:
 January 18 – Samuel Garth (born 1661), English physician and poet
 May 29 – Joseph de Jouvancy (born 1643), French poet, pedagogue, philologist and historian
 June 17 – Joseph Addison (born 1672), English essayist, poet, writer and politician

See also

Poetry
List of years in poetry
List of years in literature
 18th century in poetry
 18th century in literature
 Augustan poetry
 Scriblerus Club

Notes

 "A Timeline of English Poetry" Web page of the Representative Poetry Online Web site, University of Toronto

18th-century poetry
Poetry